Fahad Kameel Marzouq (born 2 January 1971) is a Kuwaiti former footballer. He competed in the men's tournament at the 1992 Summer Olympics.

References

External links
 

1971 births
Living people
Kuwaiti footballers
Kuwait international footballers
Olympic footballers of Kuwait
Footballers at the 1992 Summer Olympics
Place of birth missing (living people)
Association football forwards
Kuwait Premier League players
Al Tadhamon SC players